U.S. Route 21 or U.S. Highway 21 (US 21) is a major north–south United States Numbered Highway in the Southeastern United States that travels . The northern terminus is in Wytheville, Virginia at an interchange with Interstate 81 (I-81) and US 52. Despite the "1" indicating that it is a major north-south highway, U.S. 21 only travels through three states, and is no longer a cross-country route as it has been replaced with Interstate 77 in both Ohio and West Virginia. It also has the second-shortest length of all of the major north-south routes, just behind U.S. 91. The route travels through the states of South Carolina, North Carolina, and Virginia. It also connects through major Southeastern cities such as Columbia, South Carolina and Charlotte, North Carolina. The northern portion of the road travels parallel to I-77 in northern South Carolina and North Carolina. The road also has three interchanges with I-26 in Lexington and Calhoun counties in South Carolina.

Route description

|-
|SC
|
|-
|NC
|
|-
|VA
|
|-
|Total
|
|}

South Carolina
US 21 travels  through the state. Beginning at Hunting Island State Park, US 21 travels west toward Beaufort, where it widens to four lanes. The route bypasses Beaufort to the south, going through Port Royal, Shell Point, and Burton. In the Beaufort area, US 21 passes by the entrances to Parris Island and MCAS Beaufort, the major Marine Corps installations in the area. North of Beaufort, US 21 continues as a four-lane divided highway and intersects with US 17. The route travels in a wrong-way concurrency with US 17 south for  before turning north towards Yemassee, South Carolina, where it becomes a rural two-lane road and intersects with US 17 Alternate. North of Yemassee, US 21 splits off and crosses I-95 at exit 42.

The two-lane route continues through rural portions of the state. US 21 goes through Smoaks and Branchville, South Carolina and bypasses Orangeburg. North of Orangeburg, US 21 runs roughly parallel to I-26 until Gaston where it conjoins US 321 and becomes an urban highway. US 21 passes through Cayce, West Columbia, and Columbia.

North of Columbia, US 21 splits from US 321, reverting to a rural two-lane road parallel to I-77. In York County, US 21 enters urban areas again, connecting Rock Hill and Fort Mill. Near the North Carolina state line, US 21 merges with I-77 near Carowinds, then enters North Carolina.

North Carolina
US 21 begins as a concurrency with I-77 in Charlotte, which it repeats three times within the state. Its first break with I-77 is along Statesville Avenue, then proceeding through Huntersville and Cornelius, however, because of its close proximity to I-77 and North Carolina Highway 115 (NC 115), it has no interchange with I-485 by itself. The second break with I-77 occurs at Mooresville, where US 21 travels through the city and then northwest into Statesville. After Statesville, US 21 travels northeast to Harmony and Brooks Crossroads, before merging back with I-77 near Jonesville. However, Jonesville and Elkin connect with Business Hwy 21 thru centers of both towns, as an alternate route paralleling I-77. North of Elkin, US 21 splits with I-77 for the last time and goes north to Sparta, passing the Blue Ridge Parkway after a major, curvy section. North of Sparta, at Twin Oaks, US 221 overlaps with US 21 before entering Virginia. US 21 travels  through the western Piedmont of North Carolina, either combined with I-77 or as a two-lane rural road; from the South Carolina state line to Elkin, travelers can easily skip a majority of US 21 via I-77.

Virginia

After a few miles crossing the state line, US 21 reaches the town of Independence, where it splits with US 221 and continues north. The route goes through the Mount Rogers National Recreation Area before entering the city of Wytheville. After a short concurrency with US 11 in downtown Wytheville, it goes north and ends at the intersection of I-81/US 52. US 21 travels  through western Virginia, mostly as a two-lane rural mountain road.

History

US 21 in the pre-Interstate era was a north–south highway connecting the area around Lake Erie and the coastal South. One of the few true north–south routes to cross the middle Appalachian Mountains, it became an important corridor for motor traffic between northeastern Ohio, western Pennsylvania, (with US 19) and western New York state with central North Carolina, central and southeastern South Carolina, and (by connecting with other highways) coastal Georgia and most of Florida. Many referred to the stretch of Hwy 21 from the Great Lakes Region to Florida as "The Lakes-to-Florida Highway".

US 21 originally (in 1926) connected Cleveland, Ohio, and Yemassee, South Carolina. In 1935 it was extended to Beaufort, South Carolina, and again in 1953 to its current southern terminus at the Atlantic Coast at Hunting Island State Park, between the city of Beaufort and Fripp Island.

In the Interstate Highway era much of US 21 became an obvious corridor for a long-distance expressway. The West Virginia Turnpike between Charleston, West Virginia, and Princeton, West Virginia, was the first segment of a planned series of toll highways along or near US 21 from Cleveland to Charlotte, North Carolina. All of the other toll highways were shelved in favor of freeways built with Interstate funding; these freeways and the West Virginia Turnpike became I-77, which completely supplanted old US 21 as a long-distance through route. I-77 was later extended to Columbia, South Carolina, also within a few miles of US 21.

Between Cleveland and Charleston, all but a relatively short segment of US 21 was completely deleted in favor of I-77, the relics being State Route 21 (SR 21), SR 821 between Byesville and Marietta, Ohio, and Guernsey County Road 35 and Tuscarawas County Road 3 (Salt Fork Road), named Old Twenty-One Road and closely follows the route of US 21 from Byesville, Ohio to the village of Newcomerstown, Ohio. County Road 35 briefly becomes a variety of street names as it passes through Cambridge, such as Byesville Road, North Avenue, 11th Street, and Clark Street, before reverting to Old Twenty-One Road on the north side of Cambridge. From there, much of the old US 21 is still intact, however, some sections were demolished and redirected in favor of I-77. Once crossing the Guernsey/Tuscarawas county line, it becomes Salt Fork Road for about a mile, before joining Ohio State Route 258, which takes it the rest of the way to Newcomerstown. In total, the entire section of Old Twenty-One Road between North Cambridge and Newcomerstown is a total of 22.5 miles. The section of US 21 between Mineral Wells and Charleston is now signed as County Route 21 in all four counties along the route (Wood, Wirt, Jackson, and Kanawha).

Between Charleston and its current northern terminus at Wytheville, Virginia, almost all of US 21 coincided with either US 60, US 19, or US 52, which remained as US 21 was deleted. The short segment of US 21 in southern West Virginia not coinciding with another U.S. Highway became an extension of West Virginia Route 16.

In North Carolina, US 21 originally entered the state along today's NC 51 into Pineville, then followed Old Pineville Road into Charlotte. In the mid-1930s, US 21 moved over to South Boulevard from Old Pineville Road. In 1969, US 21 was rerouted following today's I-77 alignment, the old route was replaced by an extension of US 521. From 1975–87, US 21 moved north in segments onto I-77 to its current alignment ending at exit 16A (Sunset Road). Further north, US 21 originally followed Old Statesville Road, replaced in 1956 by NC 115. In 1966, US 21 was bypassed around Jonesville and Elkin, replaced with US 21 Business.

US 21 in Beaufort, South Carolina was rerouted around the city over former SC 280 as well as a portion of SC 802. The new routing went into effect on February 26, 2012.

Major intersections

Special routes and auxiliary routes

There are currently four active business loops and two known connectors along its route.
 U.S. Route 21 Business (Beaufort, South Carolina)
 U.S. Route 21 Business (Orangeburg, South Carolina)
 U.S. Route 21 Connector (Orangeburg, South Carolina)
 U.S. Route 21 Connector (Columbia, South Carolina)
 U.S. Route 21 Business (Fort Mill, South Carolina)
 U.S. Route 21 Business (Elkin, North Carolina)

Auxiliary routes of U.S. Route 21

U.S. Route 121
U.S. Route 221
U.S. Route 321
U.S. Route 421
U.S. Route 521

See also

 Blue Ridge Parkway
 Catawba River
 Carowinds
 Congaree River
 Hunting Island State Park
 Lake Norman
 Lake Norman State Park
 Lake Wateree
 Lake Wateree State Recreation Area
 Marine Corps Air Station Beaufort
 Mount Rogers National Recreation Area
 New River
 North Carolina Bicycle Route 4
 Stone Mountain State Park
 Uptown Charlotte
 Yadkin River

References

External links

 Endpoints of U.S. Highway 21

 
21
21
21
21
Transportation in Grayson County, Virginia
Transportation in Wythe County, Virginia
Transportation in Alleghany County, North Carolina
Transportation in Iredell County, North Carolina
Transportation in Mecklenburg County, North Carolina
Transportation in Surry County, North Carolina
Transportation in Wilkes County, North Carolina
Transportation in Yadkin County, North Carolina
Transportation in Bamberg County, South Carolina
Transportation in Beaufort County, South Carolina
Transportation in Calhoun County, South Carolina
Transportation in Chester County, South Carolina
Transportation in Colleton County, South Carolina
Transportation in Fairfield County, South Carolina
Transportation in Hampton County, South Carolina
Transportation in Lexington County, South Carolina
Transportation in Orangeburg County, South Carolina
Transportation in Richland County, South Carolina
Transportation in York County, South Carolina
21
21